Owen Wister (July 14, 1860 – July 21, 1938) was an American writer and historian, considered the "father" of western fiction. He is best remembered for writing The Virginian and a biography of Ulysses S. Grant.

Biography

Early life

Owen Wister was born on July 14, 1860, in Germantown, a neighborhood in the northwestern part of Philadelphia, Pennsylvania.  His father, Owen Jones Wister, was a wealthy physician raised at Grumblethorpe in Germantown.  He was a distant cousin of Sally Wister through his descent from John Wister (born Johannes Wüster) (1708–1789), brother of Caspar Wistar. His mother, Sarah Butler Wister, was the daughter of Fanny Kemble, a British actress, and Pierce Mease Butler. Pierce Mease Butler, heir to a fabulous fortune, was a notorious profligate, gambler, and slaveowner. In 1906 Wister wrote a novel, Lady Baltimore, glorifying plantation life. His friend and Harvard classmate, Theodore Roosevelt, wrote to him criticizing the Southern bias of the novel.

Education

Wister briefly attended schools in Switzerland and Britain, and later studied at St. Paul's School in Concord, New Hampshire and Harvard University in Cambridge, Massachusetts, where he was a member of the Hasty Pudding Theatricals, and a member of Delta Kappa Epsilon (Alpha chapter). Wister was also a member of the Porcellian Club, through which he became lifelong friends with future 26th President Theodore Roosevelt. As a senior Wister wrote the Hasty Pudding's then most successful show, Dido and Aeneas, whose proceeds aided in the construction of their theater. Wister graduated from Harvard in 1882.

At first he aspired to a career in music and spent two years studying at a Paris conservatory. Thereafter, he worked briefly in a bank in New York before studying law; he graduated from Harvard Law School in 1888. Following this, he practiced with a Philadelphia firm but was never truly interested in that career. He was interested in politics, however, and was a staunch supporter of U.S. president Theodore Roosevelt.

Harvard's Board of Overseers had Theodore Roosevelt as a member in 1916 and Owen Wister as a member in 1918.

In the 1930s, Wister opposed President Franklin D. Roosevelt and his New Deal.

Writing career

Wister began his literary work in 1882, publishing The New Swiss Family Robinson, a parody of the 1812 novel The Swiss Family Robinson. It was so well received that Mark Twain wrote a letter to Wister praising it.

Wister had spent several summers in the American West, making his first trip to the Territory of Wyoming in 1885, planning to shoot big game, fish trout, meet the Indians, and spend nights in the wild. Like his friend Teddy Roosevelt, Wister was fascinated with the culture, lore and terrain of the region. He was "...struck with wonder and delight, had the eye to see and the talent to portray the life unfolding in America. After six journeys [into the dying 'wild west'] for pleasure, he gave up the profession of law...", and became the writer he is better known as. On an 1893 visit to Yellowstone National Park, Wister met the western artist Frederic Remington, who remained a lifelong friend.

When he started writing, Wister naturally inclined towards fiction set on the western frontier. His most famous work remains the 1902 novel The Virginian, a complex mixture of persons, places and events dramatized from experience, word of mouth, and his own imaginationultimately creating the archetypal cowboy, who is a natural aristocrat, set against a highly mythologized version of the Johnson County War, and taking the side of the large landowners. This is widely regarded as being the first cowboy novel, though many modern scholars argue that this distinction belongs to Emma Ghent Curtis's The Administratrix, published over ten years earlier.  The Virginian was reprinted fourteen times in eight months. It stands as one of the top 50 best-selling works of fiction and is considered by Hollywood experts to be the basis for the modern fictional cowboy portrayed in literature, film, and television.

In 1904 Wister collaborated with Kirke La Shelle on a successful stage adaptation of The Virginian that featured Dustin Farnum in the title role. Farnum reprised the role ten years later in Cecil B. DeMille's film adaptation of the play.

Wister was a member of several literary societies, a member of The Franklin Inn Club, a fellow of the American Academy of Arts and Sciences and a member of the Board of Overseers of Harvard University.

Personal life
In 1898, Wister married Mary Channing, his cousin. The couple had six children. Channing died during childbirth in 1913.  Their daughter, Marina Wister, married artist Andrew Dasburg in 1933.

Death

In 1938, Wister died at his home in Saunderstown, Rhode Island. He is buried in Laurel Hill Cemetery in Philadelphia.

Legacy
Since 1978, University of Wyoming Student Publications has published the literary and arts magazine Owen Wister Review. The magazine was published bi-annually until 1996 and became an annual publication in the spring of 1997.

Just within the western boundary of the Grand Teton National Park in Wyoming, there is an 11,490-foot mountain named Mount Wister, named for Owen Wister.

Near a house that Wister built near La Mesa, California, but never occupied due to his wife's death, is a street called Wister Drive. In the same neighborhood are Virginian Lane and Molly Woods Avenue (named for a character in The Virginian). All of those streets were named by Wister himself.

In 1976, he was inducted into the Hall of Great Westerners of the National Cowboy & Western Heritage Museum.

Bibliography

Novels
The New Swiss Family Robinson (1882)
The Dragon of Wantley: His Tale (1892)
Lin McLean (1897) (1918 filmed as A Woman's Fool by John Ford)
The Virginian: A Horseman of the Plains (1902)
Philosophy 4: A Story of Harvard University (1903)
A Journey in Search of Christmas (1904)
 
Padre Ignacio: or, the Song of Temptation (1911)
Romney: And Other New Works about Philadelphia (written 1912–1915; published incomplete 2001)

Non-fiction
In Memory of Thomas Wharton (introduction, pp.ix-xxii) to Bobbo and Other Fancies (1897) by Wharton, Thomas Isaac (1859-1896)
Ulysses S. Grant (1901)
Oliver Wendell Holmes, in the "American Men of Letters Series" (1902)
The Bison, Musk-Ox, Sheep, and Goat Family, with G. B. Grinnell and Caspar Whitney in the "American Sportsman's Library" (1903)
Benjamin Franklin, in the "English Men of Letters Series" (1904)
The Seven Ages of Washington: A Biography (1907)
The Pentecost of Calamity (1915)
The Aftermath of Battle: With the Red Cross in France (1916) (preface to Edward D. Toland's autobiography)
A Straight Deal: or the Ancient Grudge (1920)
Neighbors Henceforth (1922)
A Monograph of the Work of Mellor Meigs & Howe (1923) (contributor)
Roosevelt: The Story of a Friendship, 1880–1919 (1930)
The Philadelphia Club, 1834–1934 (1934)
The Illustrations of Frederic Remington (1970) (commentary)

Story collections
Red Men and White (1895) (aka Salvation Gap and Other Western Classics)
The Jimmyjohn Boss and Other Stories (1900)
Members of the Family (1911) (Illus. H. T. Dunn)
Safe in the Arms of Croesus (1927)
When West Was West (1928)
The West of Owen Wister: Selected Short Stories (1972)

Short stories

"The New Swiss Family Robinson: A Tale for Children of All Ages", a parody of The Swiss Family Robinson (1882); new edition, 1922
"Hank's Woman" (1892) (in The Jimmyjohn Boss)
"How Lin McLean Went East" (1892) (incorporated into Lin McLean)
"Em'ly" (1893) (incorporated into The Virginian)
"The Winning of the Biscuit-Shooter" (1893) (incorporated into Lin McLean)
"Balaam and Pedro" (1894)  (incorporated into The Virginian)
"The Promised Land (Wister short story)" (1894) (in The Jimmyjohn Boss)
"A Kinsman of Red Cloud" (1894) (in The Jimmyjohn Boss)
"Little Big Horn Medicine" (1894) (in Red Men and White)
"Specimen Jones" (1894) (in Red Men and White)
"The Serenade at Siskiyou" (1894) (in Red Men and White)
"The General's Bluff" (1894) (in Red Men and White)
"Salvation Gap" (1894) (in Red Men and White)
"Lin McLean's Honey-Moon" (1895) (incorporated into Lin McLean)
"The Second Missouri Compromise" (1895) (in Red Men and White)
"La Tinaja Bonita" (1895) (in Red Men and White)
"A Pilgrim on the Gila" (1895) (in Red Men and White)
"Where Fancy Was Bred" (1896) (incorporated into The Virginian)
"Separ's Vigilante" (1897) (incorporated into Lin McLean)
"Grandmother Stark" (1897) (incorporated into The Virginian)
"Sharon's Choice" (1897) (in The Jimmyjohn Boss)
"Destiny at Drybone" (1897) (incorporated into Lin McLean)
"Twenty Minutes for Refreshments" (1900) (in The Jimmyjohn Boss)
"Padre Ignazio" (1900) (in The Jimmyjohn Boss)
"The Game and the Nation" (1900) (incorporated into The Virginian)
"Mother" (1901,1907) (in Safe in the Arms of Croesus)
"Superstition Trail" (1901) (incorporated into The Virginian)
"In a State of Sin" (1902) (incorporated into The Virginian)
"The Vicious Circle" (1902) (in The Saturday Evening Post, December 13, 1902; later revised as Spit-Cat Creek)
"With Malice Aforethought" (1902) (incorporated into The Virginian)
"Stanwick's Business" (1904) (in Safe in the Arms of Croesus)
"The Jimmyjohn Boss" (in The Jimmyjohn Boss)
"Napoleon Shave-Tail" (in The Jimmyjohn Boss)
"Happy Teeth" (in Members of the Family)
"Spit-Cat Creek" (in Members of the Family)
"In the Back" (in Members of the Family)
"How Doth the Simple Spelling Bee" (1907) (Illus. Frederic Rodrigo Gruger) (in Safe in the Arms of Croesus)
Timberline (Wister short story)|"Timberline" (1908) (in Members of the Family)
The Gift Horse (Wister short story)|"The Gift Horse" (1908) (in Members of the Family)
"Extra Dry" (1909) (in Members of the Family)
"Where It Was" (1911) (in Members of the Family)
"The Drake Who Had Means of His Own" (1911) (in Members of the Family)
"Safe in the Arms of Croesus" (in Safe in the Arms of Croesus)
"With the Coin of Her Life" (in Safe in the Arms of Croesus)
"The Honeymoonshiners" (in Safe in the Arms of Croesus)
"Bad Medicine (Wister short story)|Bad Medicine" (in When West Was West)
"Captain Quid" (in When West Was West)
"Once Round the Clock" (in When West Was West)
"The Right Honorable, The Strawberries" (1928) (in When West Was West)
"Little Old Scaffold" (1928) (in When West Was West)
"Absalom of Moulting Pelican" (1928) (in When West Was West)
"Lone Fountain" (in When West Was West)
"Skip to My Loo" (in When West Was West)
"At the Sign of the Last Chance" (1928) (in When West Was West)

Essays

"Where Charity Begins" (1895)
"The Evolution of the Cow-Puncher" (1895)
"Concerning "Bad Men" The True "Bad Man" of the Frontier, and the Reasons for His Existence" (1901)
"Theodore Roosevelt, Harvard '80" (1901)
"The Open Air Education" (1902)
"After Four Years" (1905)
"High Speed English and American Railroad Flyers" (1906)
"The Keystone Crime: Pennsylvania's Graft-Cankered Capitol" (1907)
"According to a Passenger" (1919)
"How One Bomb Was Made" (1921)
"Roosevelt and the 1912 Disaster: A Friend Remembers - and Interprets" (1930)
"Roosevelt and the War: A Chapter of Memories" (1930)
"John Jay Chapman (Wister essay)|John Jay Chapman" (1934)
"In Homage to Mark Twain" (1935)
"Old Yellowstone Days" (1936)

Poetry
"The Pale Cast of Thought" (1890)
"From Beyond the Sea" (1890)
"Autumn on Wind River" (1897)
"In Memoriam" (1902)
Done In The Open (1902) (Illus. by Frederic Remington)
"Serenade" (1910)
Indispensable Information for Infants: Or Easy Entrance to Education (1921)

Operas
Dido and Aeneas (1892)
Kenilworth (unpublished)
Listen to Binks (unpublished)
Montezuma (unpublished)
Villon (unpublished)
Watch Your Thirst: A Dry Opera in Three Acts (1923)

Plays
The Dragon of Wantley (unpublished)
The Honeymoonshiners (published in the story collection Safe in the Arms of Croesus)
Lin McLean (unpublished)
Slaves of the Ring (unpublished)
That Brings Luck (unpublished)
The Virginian (unpublished)

Works inspired by The Virginian
Many movie industry historians will agree that most, if not all, westerns can be claimed to contain influences from The Virginian. It is nearly universally accepted that the "Hollywood cowboy" was, and still is, based on this book.

The Virginian (1914 film) directed by Cecil B. DeMille, with Dustin Farnum
The Virginian (1923 film) with Kenneth Harlan and Florence Vidor
The Virginian (1929 film) with Gary Cooper and Walter Huston
The Virginian (1946 film) with Joel McCrea and Brian Donlevy
The Virginian (1962–1971 TV series) with James Drury and Doug McClure
The Virginian 2000 telefilm with Bill Pullman, Diane Lane, John Savage, Colm Feore, and Dennis Weaver
The Virginian 2014 telefilm with Trace Adkins, Brendan Penny, Ron Perlman, and Victoria Pratt

References

Further reading

 Etulain, Richard W. Owen Wister (Boise  State College. 1973) online. 
 Lambert, Neal. "Owen Wister's Virginian: The Genesis of a Cultural Hero." Western American Literature 6.2 (1971): 99-107. online

 Robinson, Forrest G. "The Roosevelt-Wister Connection: Some Notes on the West and the Uses of History." Western American Literature 14.2 (1979): 95-114. online
 Sherman, Dean. "Owen Wister: An Annotated Bibliography" Bulletin of Bibliography 28 (Jan-March 1971) 7–16.
 Vorpahl, Ben Merchant. My dear Wister: The Frederic Remington-Owen Wister Letters (Palo Alto, Calif.: American West, 1972).
 Vorpahl, Ben M. "Henry James and Owen Wister." Pennsylvania Magazine of History and Biography 95.3 (1971): 291-338. online
 Whipp, Leslie T. "Owen Wister: Wyoming's Influential Realist and Craftsman." Great Plains Quarterly (1990) 10#4: 245-259. online
 White, G. Edward. The Eastern Establishment and the Western Experience: The West of Frederic Remington, Theodore Roosevelt, and Owen Wister (U of Texas Press, 2012).

External links

 Owen Wister Papers at the University of Wyoming – American Heritage Center
 
 
History of Owen Wister & Medicine Bow, Wyoming
Owen Wister Review
"Owen Wister" by Richard W. Etulain in the Western Writers Series Digital Editions
Western American Literature Journal: Owen Wister
 
 
 
 
Romney, Penn State Press, 2001 Sample chapter available
La Salle University Local History, Owen Wister and his family at Belfield, now the grounds of La Salle University, Philadelphia, PA
Loc.gov
Article in Pittsburgh Post-Gazette on Wister

19th-century American novelists
20th-century American novelists
American male novelists
Western (genre) writers
Writers from Philadelphia
Writers from Wyoming
St. Paul's School (New Hampshire) alumni
1860 births
1938 deaths
Pennsylvania Republicans
The Harvard Lampoon alumni
Members of the Philadelphia Club
Members of the American Philosophical Society
Wister family
Germantown Academy alumni
Burials at Laurel Hill Cemetery (Philadelphia)
19th-century American male writers
American people of English descent
American people of German descent
Harvard Law School alumni
20th-century American male writers
Hasty Pudding alumni
Novelists from Pennsylvania
Theodore Roosevelt
Members of the American Academy of Arts and Letters
American people of Anglo-Irish descent